Jodisk Familieblad was a Jewish magazine which appeared in Copenhagen, Denmark, between 1928 and 1940. It was the official organ of the Det Mosaiske Troessamfund which was the Jewish congregation of Copenhagen.

History and profile
Jodisk Familieblad was launched by Max Goldschmid in Copenhagen in 1928. Its title was first Jødisk Samfund and then Jødisk Orientering. In 1929 it was renamed as Jodisk Familieblad, and the first issue with this title appeared in March 1929. The magazine was the official media outlet of Det Mosaiske Troessamfund. The editor of the magazine was Chief Rabbi Marcus Melchior. The last issue came out in April 1940.

References

1928 establishments in Denmark
1940 disestablishments in Denmark
Danish-language magazines
Defunct magazines published in Denmark
Jewish magazines
Judaism in Copenhagen
Magazines established in 1928
Magazines disestablished in 1940
Magazines published in Copenhagen